Jackie Linehan (28 October 1864 – 8 March 1944) was an Irish hurler who played for Cork Championship club Aghabullogue. He played for the Cork senior hurling team for one season, during which time he usually lined out as a full-forward.

Playing career

Aghabullogue

Linehan joined the Aghabullogue club when it was founded and quickly became one of the club's top scoring forwards. On 13 July 1890, he lined out when Aghabullogue defeated Aghada by 7-03 to 1-01 to win the Cork Championship.

Cork

Linehan made his first appearance for the Cork hurling team on 29 September 1890. He lined out in the forwards as Cork defeated Kerry by 2-00 to 0-01 to win the Munster Championship. Linehan was again in the forward line on 16 November when Cork defeated Wexford by 1-06 to 2-02 in the All-Ireland final.

Honours

Aghabullogue
Cork Senior Hurling Championship (1): 1890

Cork
All-Ireland Senior Hurling Championship (1): 1890
Munster Senior Hurling Championship (1): 1890

References

External links

 Jackie Linehan obituary

1864 births
1944 deaths
Aghabullogue hurlers
Cork inter-county hurlers
All-Ireland Senior Hurling Championship winners
Hurling forwards